Marcos Sugiyama (born Marcos Almeida Esteves; 16 November 1973) is a Brazilian and former Japanese volleyball player. He was an athlete who played for the Japanese Volleyball Team, Sakai Blazers, Suntory Sunbirds and Toyoda Gosei Trefuerza. He obtained his Japanese citizenship in 2003. He started practicing volleyball at just 8 years old at Dom Lucio State School and became a professional athlete at 17 years old and ended his professional volleyball career at 42 years old. He is married to Bruna Gabriele de Lima Esteves. He became a Volleyball Coach in 2014. He graduated as a Physical Education Teacher and is also graduated as a Volleyball Coach by the Brazilian Volleyball Confederation Level (I, II, III) by the graduate professor and doctorate in volleyball Mr. Professor Josenildo de Carvalho and Mr. Professor Ari Rabello. His mother is Japanese Katsuko Sugiyama and she practiced athletics in the Long Jump and High Jump events as well as fast runs. His father Dorival Carlos Esteves is Brazilian (in memorian 2019) his father is the first black player to play in Japan Soccer League. Marcos Sugiyama lives in Saitama Japan.

References

1973 births
Japanese men's volleyball players
Living people
Japanese people of Brazilian descent
Naturalized citizens of Japan
Brazilian people of Japanese descent